A list of animated feature films that were first released in 1976.

See also
 List of animated television series of 1976

References

Feature films
1976
1976-related lists